Shirvaneh may refer to:
 Shirvaneh, Kamyaran
 Shirvaneh, Qorveh